The UCI Cyclo-cross World Championships – Men's Under-23 Cyclo-cross is the annual world championship for in the discipline of cyclo-cross for men aged 23 or under, organised by the world governing body, the Union Cycliste Internationale. The event was first run in 1996. The winner has the right to wear the rainbow jersey for a full year when competing in Under-23 cyclo-cross events.

Palmares

Medal count by country

 
UCI Cyclo-cross World Championships